Anthomyia pluvialis is a species of fly in the family Anthomyiidae. It is found in the Palearctic.

References

Anthomyiidae
Flies described in 1758
Brachyceran flies of Europe
Taxa named by Carl Linnaeus